The following is a complete list of compositions by Carl Maria von Weber in order of both opus number and catalogue number. A complete chronological catalogue of Weber's works was compiled by Friedrich Wilhelm Jähns and published in 1871. Catalogue numbers are indicated by a preceding "J.".

By opus number

By Jähns catalogue number

See also
List of operas by Carl Maria von Weber

References

 
Weber